The 2017–18 NCAA football bowl games was a series of college football bowl games which completed the 2017 NCAA Division I FBS football season. The games began on December 16, 2017, and aside from the all-star games ended with the 2018 College Football Playoff National Championship which was played on January 8, 2018.

The total of 40 team-competitive bowls in FBS, including the national championship game, was one less than the previous year, with the folding of the Poinsettia Bowl. To fill the 78 available bowl slots, a total of 15 teams (19% of all participants) with non-winning (6–6) seasons participated in bowl games.  This marks only the second time in seven years that no teams with losing seasons (6–7 or 5–7) had to be invited to fill available bowl berths.

Schedule
The schedule for the 2017–18 bowl games is below. All times are EST (UTC−5).

College Football Playoff and Championship Game
The College Football Playoff system was used to determine a national champion of Division I FBS college football. A 13-member committee of experts ranked the top 25 teams in the nation after each of the last seven weeks of the 2017 season.  The top four teams in the final ranking played a single-elimination semifinal round, with the winners advancing to the National Championship game.

The semifinal games were the Rose Bowl and the Sugar Bowl. Both were played on New Year's Day, as part of a yearly rotation of three pairs of six bowls, commonly referred to as the CFP New Year's Six bowl games. Their winners advanced to the 2018 College Football Playoff National Championship at Mercedes-Benz Stadium in Atlanta, Georgia, on January 8, 2018.

Each of the games in the following table was televised by ESPN.

Non-CFP bowl games
On April 11, 2016, the NCAA announced a freeze on new bowl games until after the 2019 season.  While bowl games had been the purview of only the very best teams for nearly a century, the NCAA had to lower its postseason eligibility criteria repeatedly (2006, 2009, 2010, 2012 and 2013), eventually allowing teams with losing seasons (5–7) to participate in bowls due to there being not enough bowl-eligible teams, while also having to allow teams from the same conference to meet in the 2015 Arizona Bowl due to the lack of eligible teams to meet its other tie-ins. For the 2017–18 bowl season, 62% of the 130 teams playing in Division I FBS were deemed eligible to participate in a bowl game, with 60% actually receiving invites to fill the 78 available slots.

For the 2017–18 bowl season, changes from the prior season's bowl games include the relocation of the Miami Beach Bowl to Frisco, Texas as the Frisco Bowl, and the discontinuation of the Poinsettia Bowl. The Russel Athletic Bowl was renamed the Camping World Bowl under a new sponsorship, and after going without a sponsor for two years, the St. Petersburg Bowl was renamed the Gasparilla Bowl (a name that pays homage to Tampa Bay's Gasparilla Pirate Festival).

FCS bowl game
The FCS has one bowl game; they also have a championship bracket that began on November 25 and ended on January 6.

All-star games

Selection of the teams

CFP top 25 teams
On December 3, 2017, the College Football Playoff selection committee announced their final team rankings for the year.

In the fourth year of the College Football Playoff era, this was the first time that two of the four semifinalists  were from the same conference (Georgia and Alabama of the SEC).

Conference champions' bowl games
Three bowls featured two conference champions playing against each other—the Dollar General Bowl, Cotton Bowl Classic, and Rose Bowl. Rankings are per the above CFP standings.

 denotes a conference that named co-champions

Bowl-eligible teams
ACC (10): Boston College, Clemson, Duke, Florida State, Louisville, Miami (FL), NC State, Virginia, Virginia Tech, Wake Forest
American (7): Houston, Memphis, Navy, SMU, South Florida, Temple, UCF
Big Ten (8): Iowa, Michigan, Michigan State, Northwestern, Ohio State, Penn State, Purdue, Wisconsin
Big 12 (8): Iowa State, Kansas State, Oklahoma, Oklahoma State, TCU, Texas, Texas Tech, West Virginia
C-USA (10): FIU, Florida Atlantic, Louisiana Tech, Marshall, Middle Tennessee, North Texas, Southern Miss, UAB, UTSA, Western Kentucky 
MAC (7): Akron, Buffalo, Central Michigan, Northern Illinois, Ohio, Toledo, Western Michigan
Mountain West (6): Boise State, Colorado State, Fresno State, San Diego State, Utah State, Wyoming
Pac-12 (9): Arizona, Arizona State, Oregon, Stanford, UCLA, USC, Utah, Washington, Washington State 
SEC (9): Alabama, Auburn, Georgia, Kentucky, LSU, Mississippi State, Missouri, South Carolina, Texas A&M
Sun Belt (5): Appalachian State, Arkansas State, Georgia State, New Mexico State, Troy
Independent (2): Army, Notre Dame

Number of bowl berths available: 78
Number of bowl-eligible teams: 81

Bowl-eligible teams that did not receive a berth
As there are more bowl-eligible teams than bowl berths, three bowl-eligible teams did not receive a bowl berth:

Buffalo (6–6)
UTSA (6–5)
Western Michigan (6–6)

Bowl-ineligible teams
ACC (4): Georgia Tech, North Carolina, Pittsburgh, Syracuse
American (5): Cincinnati, East Carolina, Tulane, Tulsa, UConn
Big Ten (6): Illinois, Indiana, Maryland, Minnesota, Nebraska, Rutgers
Big 12 (2): Baylor, Kansas
C-USA (4): Charlotte, Old Dominion, Rice, UTEP
MAC (5): Ball State, Bowling Green, Eastern Michigan, Kent State, Miami (OH) 
Mountain West (6): Air Force, Hawaii, Nevada, New Mexico, San Jose State, UNLV
Pac-12 (3): California, Colorado, Oregon State 
SEC (5): Arkansas, Florida, Ole Miss, Tennessee, Vanderbilt
Sun Belt (7): Coastal Carolina, Georgia Southern, Idaho, Louisiana, Louisiana–Monroe, South Alabama, Texas State
Independent (2): BYU, UMass

Number of bowl-ineligible teams: 49

Television viewers and ratings

Most watched non-CFP bowl games

#CFP Rankings.

College Football Playoff

Notes

References

Further reading